{{DISPLAYTITLE:C18H32O2}}
The molecular formula C18H32O2 (molar mass: 280.44 g/mol) may refer to:

 Conjugated linoleic acid
 Linoleic acid
 Linoelaidic acid
 Malvalic acid
 Rumenic acid, bovinic acid
 Tariric acid, an acetylenic fatty acid

Molecular formulas